Rathangan is a small village located in the south of County Wexford, in Ireland.

Details
It has a size of approximately 1,866 square metres. It contains a primary school and a pub called Rathangan Bar, which also contains a restaurant and takeaway. Rathangan also contains a Roman Catholic church, which dates from 1873. Rathangan Hall, a local community hall, hosts after-school activities. There is a graveyard at the corner. As of May 2015, the school had nearly 300 pupils. It is in the Duncormick area. Rathangan contains a GAA club, three pitches and an 
completed astro-turf.

See also
 List of towns and villages in Ireland

References

External links
http://www.rathangan.net/
Rathangan RC church.

Towns and villages in County Wexford